José Alberto Djaló Embaló (born 3 May 1993) is a footballer who plays as a center-forward. Born in Portugal, he plays for the Guinea-Bissau national team. Besides Portugal, he has played in Cyprus, Romania, Iceland, Poland, Armenia and now Malaysia.

Career

Club
On 27 January 2013, Embaló made his professional debut with AEL Limassol in the Cypriot First Division match against Nea Salamis replacing Orlando Sá (60th minute).

International
Embaló made his debut for Guinea-Bissau national football team on 23 March 2022 against Equatorial Guinea, scoring two goals in their 3-0 victory.

Personal life
Embaló is the cousin of the Portuguese footballer Yannick Djaló.

Career statistics

International

International goals
Scores and results list Guinea-Bissau's goal tally first. Score column indicates score after each Embaló goal.

References

External links

1993 births
Living people
Sportspeople from Funchal
Bissau-Guinean footballers
Guinea-Bissau international footballers
Portuguese footballers
Portuguese sportspeople of Bissau-Guinean descent
Association football forwards
AEL Limassol players
S.C. Beira-Mar players
FC Rapid București players
Ayia Napa FC players
Raków Częstochowa players
Casa Pia A.C. players
Puszcza Niepołomice players
Olimpia Grudziądz players
Sabah F.C. (Malaysia) players
Cypriot First Division players
Cypriot Second Division players
Liga Portugal 2 players
Liga II players
I liga players
Campeonato de Portugal (league) players
Bissau-Guinean expatriate footballers
Portuguese expatriate footballers
Expatriate footballers in Cyprus
Expatriate footballers in Romania
Expatriate footballers in Iceland
Expatriate footballers in Poland
Portuguese expatriate sportspeople in Cyprus
Portuguese expatriate sportspeople in Romania
Portuguese expatriate sportspeople in Iceland
Portuguese expatriate sportspeople in Poland